Colosseum Mountain is a 12,473-foot-elevation (3,802 meter) double summit mountain located on the crest of the Sierra Nevada mountain range in northern California. It is situated on the common border of Fresno County with Inyo County, as well as the shared boundary of John Muir Wilderness and Kings Canyon National Park. The lower east summit is 12,451-feet in elevation and marked as Colosseum Mountain on maps, but the 12,473-foot west summit is higher. Approximately 1,000 feet distance separate the two summits. The John Muir Trail passes to the west of this peak, providing an approach to the mountain. The first ascent of the summit was made August 5, 1922, by Chester Versteeg, a prominent Sierra Club member, via the southwest face.

Climate
According to the Köppen climate classification system, Colosseum Mountain has an alpine climate. Most weather fronts originate in the Pacific Ocean, and travel east toward the Sierra Nevada mountains. As fronts approach, they are forced upward by the peaks, causing them to drop their moisture in the form of rain or snowfall onto the range (orographic lift). Precipitation runoff from this mountain drains west into Woods Creek, which is a tributary of the South Fork Kings River, and east to the Owens Valley via Division Creek.

Climbing
Established climbing routes on Colosseum Mountain:

 Southwest slope –  – First ascent 1922
 West Ridge – class 1
 Northwest Chute – class 2
 North Ridge – class 4

See also
 List of mountain peaks of California

References

External links
 
 Weather forecast: Colosseum Mountain

Mountains of Fresno County, California
Mountains of Kings Canyon National Park
Inyo National Forest
Mountains of Inyo County, California
Mountains of the John Muir Wilderness
North American 3000 m summits
Mountains of Northern California
Sierra Nevada (United States)